Les Chutes-de-la-Chaudière-Est is a borough of the city of Lévis, Quebec.  It was created on January 1, 2002.

It corresponds to the eastern part of the former Les Chutes-de-la-Chaudière Regional County Municipality.

It has four districts, corresponding to former municipalities:
 Charny
 Saint-Romuald
 Saint-Jean-Chrysostome
 Sainte-Hélène-de-Breakeyville

References

Boroughs of Lévis, Quebec